Akbar (1542–1605) was the third Mughal Emperor.

Akbar or Ackbar may also refer to:

Akbar (name)
, a number of ships of the Royal Navy
, a U.S. Navy patrol boat during World War I
Akbar, Basilan, a municipality in the Philippines
Akbar, 1967 Indian documentary film about the emperor by Shanti S. Varma, won a National Film Award
Akbar the Great, Indian television series about the emperor directed by Akbar Khan, aired on DD National

See also
Allahu Akbar (disambiguation)
Akbari (disambiguation), an Iranian surname
Akbarian
Akhbar (disambiguation), a different word, meaning news
Shahenshah Akbar, a 1943 Indian film about the emperor
Admiral Ackbar, a character from the Star Wars saga